Procrimima is a genus of moths in the subfamily Arctiinae.

Species
 Procrimima procris Felder, 1875
 Procrimima viridis Druce, 1906

References

Natural History Museum Lepidoptera generic names catalog

Lithosiini
Moth genera